Dramane Kamaté (born August 31, 1985 in Abidjan, Ivory Coast) is a professional footballer who currently plays for Andorra CF in the Spanish Third Division Group 17.

Career
He was signed from Chengdu Blades in 2008 alongside fellow Ivorians Bamba Moussa, Sékou Tidiane Souare and Kourouma Mohamed Lamine. After one season for Ferencvarosi TC of the eastern group of the Hungarian second division, he left in the middle of 2009 to sign for AS Korofina in Mali. After one year in Mali returned to Europe, to sign with Spanish Second Division club Racing Club de Ferrol. After two years and 12 games, joined to SD Rayo Cantabria.

International 
He also has played for the Ivory Coast national under-23 football team.

References

Ivorian footballers
1985 births
Living people
Expatriate footballers in China
Ivorian expatriates in China
Chengdu Tiancheng F.C. players
China League One players
Expatriate footballers in Hungary
Ivorian expatriates in Hungary
AS Korofina players
Racing de Ferrol footballers
Expatriate footballers in Mali
Ivorian expatriates in Mali
JC d'Abidjan players
Footballers from Abidjan
Deportivo Rayo Cantabria players
Association football forwards